Andrej Vizjak (born 6 August 1964) is a Slovenian politician. Between 2004 and 2008 he served as Minister of Economy in the 8th Government of Slovenia, and between 2012 and 2013 as Minister of Labour, Family and Social Affairs in the 10th Government of Slovenia. From 2020 to 2022 he was Minister of the Environment and Spatial Planning in the 14th Government of Slovenia.

References 

Living people
1964 births
Place of birth missing (living people)
Environment ministers of Slovenia
Family ministers of Slovenia
Labour ministers of Slovenia
Social affairs ministers of Slovenia
21st-century Slovenian politicians